Kyriakos S. Pittakis or Pittakys (1798–1863) was a Greek archaeologist of the 19th century. He is most notable as the first Greek Ephor-General of Antiquities of Greece, the head of the Greek Archaeological Service, and for his role in the conservation and restoration of monuments on the Acropolis of Athens. He has been described as a "dominant figure in Greek archaeology for 27 years", and as "one of the most important epigraphers of the nineteenth century". 

One of the few native Greeks active in Greek archaeology during the late Ottoman period and the early years of the Kingdom of Greece, Pittakis played an influential role in the early years of the Greek Archaeological Service and the Archaeological Society of Athens. He was responsible for much of the early excavation and restoration of the Acropolis, including attempts to restore the Erechtheion, the Parthenon, the Temple of Athena Nike and the Propylaia. As ephor of the Central Public Museum for Antiquities from 1836, and later as Ephor General, he was largely responsible for the conservation and protection of many of the monuments and artefacts then known from Ancient Greece.

Pittakis was prolific both as an excavator and as an archaeological writer, publishing by his own estimation more than 4,000 inscriptions. He has been praised for his extensive efforts to uncover and protect Greece's classical heritage, particularly in Athens and the adjacent islands, but criticised for his unsystematic and incautious approach. His reconstructions of ancient monuments often placed aesthetics over fidelity to the original, and were largely reverted after his death. He has also been accused of allowing his strong nationalist beliefs to influence his reconstruction of ancient monuments, and of distorting the archaeological record to suit his own beliefs.

Early life

Pittakis was born in Athens in 1798. His family origins are obscure: he was likely from a humble background. A contemporary described him as having been born "beneath a forgotten cornice of the Acropolis … which protectively sheltered his cradle." He seems to have been largely self-taught in archaeology, but became apprenticed around the age of sixteen to the French vice-consul Louis-François-Sébastien Fauvel, sometimes called the 'Father of Archaeology in Greece'. During this period, he established his interest in epigraphy, copying inscriptions from the Acropolis and concealing moveable antiquities from Ottoman forces, who then occupied Greece. He was also supported in his early archaeological work by the 'Philomousos Hetaireia', a learned society with a particular interest in antiquities.

Pittakis is said to have met and befriended Lord Byron during the latter's visits to Athens in 1809–1810. Teresa Makri, the sister of Pittakis' wife Aiketerini, is generally considered the inspiration for the 'Maid of Athens' of Byron's 1811 poem.

Greek War of Independence 

After growing tensions and preparations throughout the early months of 1821, the Greek War of Independence began in March 1821. When rebel villagers from Attica entered the city on behalf of the revolutionaries in April, the Turkish garrison retreated to the Acropolis. Ottoman forces briefly recaptured the city in July, but largely departed in August, leaving only a small force behind, whereupon the population rebelled again, forcing the Turks back to the Acropolis and beginning the First Siege of the Acropolis, which would continue until 10 June.

Pittakis was a member of the Filiki Eteria, a nationalist secret society formed to oppose Ottoman rule in Greece. He was present in Athens during 1821–1822, and a member of the irregular Greek force that besieged and eventually retook the Acropolis. He may have witnessed, or participated in, the massacre of several hundred Turkish prisoners from the siege in June 1822: his mentor Fauvel, the French vice-consul, sheltered some of the survivors in his home until the arrival of two French warships allowed their evacuation. 

He later claimed credit for the 1821 rediscovery of the klepsydra, an ancient spring on the Acropolis, which ensured a fresh water supply to the Greek forces who occupied the site between 1822 and 1827. However, the discovery was also claimed by the Greek military leader Odysseas Androutsos and by the Swiss scholar Felix Stähelin, and is likely to have originally been accidental. During his service in 1822, he acquired the manuscript of the Chronicle of Anthimos, a history of Athens written by Ioannis Venizelos, which Pittakis would eventually publish in 1853. He also spent time on the islands of Aegina and Salamis during 1821–1822, where he recorded several inscriptions that had been moved there from Athens on account of the fighting.

For his service in the War of Independence, he was later awarded a 'certificate of patriotism' by the Athenian city government. His brother was killed and buried on the Acropolis during the war, either during the first siege or the second, which took place in 1826–1827.

During and after the war, Pittakis corresponded with the British architect Thomas Leverton Donaldson, sharing with him news of archaeological discoveries to which scholars outside Greece no longer had access.

Reputed 'columns for cannonballs' exchange

According to a much-cited anecdote, during the siege of the Acropolis, the Ottoman occupiers began to run low on lead ammunition, and began to destroy the marble columns of the Parthenon in order to remove the lead clamps which held them together. Pittakis, in an effort to preserve the ancient temple, is said to have offered to send ammunition to the Turkish defenders, as long as they left the columns intact. The laconic phrase "here are bullets, do not touch the columns!" is often associated with the alleged incident.

The story is most likely apocryphal. It is first attested in an 1859 letter by the writer Aristotelis Valaoritis, in which the protagonist is named as Odysseas Androutsos, who only arrived in Athens two months after the Acropolis was retaken; contemporary reports from the siege indicate that the Greeks themselves fired artillery on the Acropolis ruins. The story was first connected with Pittakis by his friend and rival Alexandros Rizos Rangavis in his eulogy for Pittakis after the latter's death in 1863. James Beresford has suggested that the origin, or at least the popularity, of the anecdote may lie in the growth in power of the Megali Idea in the mid-19th century, and the desire to strengthen the perceived links between modern Greeks and the heritage of Ancient Greece so as to justify the 'return' of the Classical Greek lands to Greece.  

The story has, however, been described as a "powerful myth" with a prominent place in the Greek national discourse, particularly around the debate over the restitution of the Elgin marbles. It has been referenced by the Greek Minister of Culture Melina Mercouri and the archaeologist Manolis Andronikos as historical fact, in an effort to argue for the sculptures' return.

Archaeological career

Between 1824 and 1828, he studied medicine at the Ionian Academy on Corfu — a common field of study for Greek intellectuals of the time, as legal, philological and architectural training were difficult for them to come by except in northern Europe. According to Vasileios Petrakos, it was on Corfu that he met his wife, Aikaterini, a fellow native of Athens. During his studies, he continued his archaeological work, returning in 1825–1826 to Salamis to transcribe and catalogue further inscriptions.

In 1828, he unsuccessfully petitioned Ioannis Kapodistrias, who had become Greece's first independent head of state in 1827, for an archaeological post. He returned to Athens, where he resumed his early work of collecting inscriptions, sending several to August Böckh for inclusion in the Corpus Inscriptionum Graecarum. He gathered antiquities from the Church of Megali Panagia, which was built on the former site of Hadrian's Library. He excavated on Salamis and Aegina in early 1829, and sent several objects to Andreas Moustoxydis, the director of Greece's national archaeological museum (then based on Aegina), for display.

In 1832, he was appointed to the unpaid role of 'custodian of the antiquities in Athens', in which capacity he gave tours of the Acropolis to foreign visitors: one of whom was the American author and poet Nathaniel Parker Willis, who recalled being shown by Pittakis Byron's graffito of his own name on one of the columns of the Erechtheion. He was appointed 'sub-ephor' of Central Greece, reporting to the Bavarian architect Adolf Weissenberg, in 1833, making him among the first native Greeks employed by the archaeological service. Now empowered to do so, he carried out his first formal works on the Acropolis, demolishing Frankish and Turkish remains in central part of the Propylaia and its north-east hall, known as the 'pinakotheke'. He also began to collect together some of the scattered antiquities from the site, many of which were the remains of bombardments during the Acropolis' two recent sieges. He also carried out the first excavations around the Parthenon, clearing its surroundings of medieval and early modern buildings, and recovering parts of the Parthenon frieze.

On 18 August 1834, by a royal decree issued on the advice of the Bavarian architect Leo von Klenze, the Bavarian military garrison was dismissed from the Acropolis and the area declared an archaeological site. Despite Pittakis' existing status as 'custodian' of its antiquities and the fact that Athens fell under the jurisdiction of his sub-ephorate, he was not selected to carry out the restoration work: instead, the task went to Ludwig Ross, a German scholar and favourite of King Otto, who was recommended by Klenze directly. Ross worked mostly alongside architects from northern Europe, particularly the Prussian Eduard Schaubert, the Danish Christian Hansen and the Saxon Eduard Laurent. The dominance of non-Greek scholars in the excavation and conservation of Greek monuments provoked resentment from the native Greek intelligentsia, and tensions between Pittakis and Ross.

In 1835, Pittakis published his first monograph in French, on the topography and ruins of Athens. The work made extensive use of epigraphy, including (as Pittakis claimed) over 800 then-unpublished inscriptions, and has been described as the first epigraphical work written by an ethnic Greek. In this volume, he published the discovery of several Ionic column capitals in the wall of the Church of the Agia Kyra Kandili near the Choragic Monument of Lysicrates, along with a dedication to Hestia, which he took to indicate an ancient temple; these have been suggested in modern times to have been part of the Prytaneion, the shrine containing the sacred fire of Hestia seen as the heart of the political community, whose original location is lost. In 1836, on Ross's resignation as Ephor General, Pittakis was appointed ephor of the 'Central Public Museum for Antiquities', which was housed in various ancient structures around Athens until the construction of the Acropolis Museum in 1874. This made him the most senior archaeologist employed by the Greek Archaeological Service, and its de facto head.

Archaeological Society of Athens

In 1837, Pittakis led the foundation of the Archaeological Society of Athens, alongside Alexandros Rizos Rangavis, the Education Minister Iakovos Rizos Neroulos and the philanthropist Konstantinos Bellios. Where both Rangavis, Neroulos and Bellios were wealthy Phanariots (a class of mostly-wealthy Greek merchants from Istanbul, who had enjoyed special privileges in the administration of the Ottoman Empire), Pittakis was unusual in the new society in being both Athenian and of a humble background, a factor which created tension between him and the other elites of the Society. The Society held its first meeting on 28 April 1837, in the Parthenon.

The Archaeological Society aimed to support the Greek Archaeological Service, which had minimal financial and human resources, in conserving, studying and excavating the monuments of Greece. Along with Rangavis, Pittakis launched and edited the periodical Archaeological Journal, one of the society's main publications. Rangavis soon resigned as co-editor, leaving Pittakis as effectively the sole writer of the journal until 1860.

From 1837, Pittakis, assisted by the Prussian architect Eduard Schaubert; Eduard Laurent, an architect from Dresden; and the Swiss sculptor Heinrich Max Imhof, carried out restoration work in the Society's name on the Acropolis. He began in the Erechtheion, a building he described as having "fallen down", throughout 1837–1840, where he reconstructed the naos using modern bricks to replace areas of fallen stonework, extended the height of some collapsed columns, and elsewhere rearranged surviving fragments to emphasise the best preserved. During the reconstruction, one of the south porch's Caryatids, which had fallen during the fighting of the War of Independence, was found and returned to its plinth. Pittakis also excavated the building, down to the floor level of its phase as a Christian church, uncovering tombs in the southern part and a cistern in the western area.

From 1841, he began to collaborate with Rangavis (now secretary of the Archaeological Society) on the restoration of the Parthenon, having previously excavated its pronaos in the late 1830s. Between 1841 and 1844, they rebuilt parts of the naos and restored part of the north and south colonnades. As he had in the Erechtheion, Pittakis reinforced part of the Parthenon's north side with a large brick wall. He ordered casts from the British Museum to replace the Parthenon sculptures taken by Lord Elgin in the early 19th century, placing them directly onto the Parthenon itself.  Pittakis intended to rebuilt the entire north colonnade, but was prevented from doing so by lack of funds. On behalf of the Archaeological Society, he excavated at Mycenae in 1841, clearing the approach to the Lion Gate and making a tentative exploration of the Tomb of Clytemnestra.

In 1842, Pittakis was placed in charge of all excavation on the Acropolis.

Ephor General of Antiquities (1843-1863)

Pittakis had a long-running feud with Ludwig Ross, Greece's Ephor General of Antiquities from 1834, which reflected wider tensions between native Greek archaeologists and the mostly-Bavarian scholars who, on the invitation of King Otto, dominated Greek archaeology in the first years of the independent state. In 1834 and 1835, excavations in the Piraeus uncovered a series of inscriptions known as the 'Naval Records', which gave information on the administration and financing of the Athenian navy between the 5th and 4th centuries BCE. Ross studied the inscriptions and sent sketches to August Boeckh for the Corpus Inscriptionum Graecarum, despite having not yet received approval to publish them. The Greek authorities asserted that Ross' actions were illegal: Pittakis attacked Ross in the press, forcing Ross' resignation as Ephor General in 1836. Nikolaos Papazarkadas has argued that Pittakis' opposition to Ross' actions was personal rather than principled, pointing out that Pittakis made no protest against the copying of several thousand Greek inscriptions by French epigraphers from 1843 onwards, a project supported by the Prime Minister, Ioannis Kolettis.

In 1843, Pittakis was appointed to Ross' former post as Ephor General of Antiquities, which he held until his death in 1863. One of his first actions, in 1843, was to complete Ross' attempted demolition of the Parthenon mosque, which had been partially destroyed during the War of Independence. He continued to curate Athens' archaeological collections, writing an 1843 guidebook in which he claimed that around 400 of the 615 objects exhibited in the Temple of Hephaestus had been collected 'as a result of [his] endeavour and passion'. He also continued to excavate on the Acropolis, completing in 1843–1844 with Rangavis the restoration of the Temple of Athena Nike, and uncovering two portions of the Parthenon frieze in 1845. He returned to the Temple of Athena Nike in 1846–1847 to install casts replacing parts of its frieze, which had been removed and taken to the British Museum.

One of Pittakis' priorities was to protect the antiquities on the Acropolis from looting and damage. Between 1847 and 1853, he arranged for the archaeological fragments scattered around the Acropolis to be collected, fixed into plaster and built into walls, and hired watchmen to ensure that none were picked up by visitors. He also established collections of these antiquities in the major monuments of the site, most of which were in locked storerooms to which only he had keys, and to which nobody was permitted access except in his presence. A substantial problem was the habit of visitors, especially sailors from the Piraeus, of chipping away pieces from the ancient structures, particularly the Erectheion: to combat this, Pittakis had the whole temple covered with stones.

From 1850, Pittakis undertook significant work in and around the Propylaea. That year, he cleared and partially reconstructed the steps approaching the monument, Pittakis enlisted Charles Ernest Beulé, a French archaeologist of the French School at Athens, to assist with the removal of medieval and modern structures from the remaining parts of the Propylaea in 1852. Beulé, against the prevailing scholarly opinion at the time, believed that Mnesikles, the architect of the Propylaia, had originally constructed a second gateway, and secured Pittakis' blessing as well as support from Alexandre de Forth-Rouen, the French ambassador to Greece, to investigate his hypothesis. On 4 May, the excavators discovered additional steps leading towards the gate, and by 17 May it had become clear that they had found the edge of a fortified wall around the Acropolis, and within it a late Roman gateway, which became known as the Beulé Gate. The site was visited by King Otto and Queen Amalia, and the discovery made Beulé's scholarly reputation. Towards the end of the excavation, used explosives to blast through a particularly difficult block of mortar, a decision criticised by contemporary archaeologists, as well as the Greek newspapers, one of which had previously accused Beulé of wanting to blow up everything on the Acropolis. Pittakis, who had been watching the operation, was almost struck by a fragment of the debris which pierced his hat: reports circulated in the aftermath that he had been killed. In 1854, Pittakis reconstructed the western part of the podium of the pinakotheke on the monument's north-eastern side, which was in danger of collapsing.

In 1851, on the resignation of Rangavis, he took the post of Secretary of the Archaeological Society of Athens, which he held until 1859. In April 1854, on the outbreak of the Crimean War, British and French troops occupied the Piraeus with the aim of preventing Greece from assisting the Russian Empire against Ottoman Turkey. The occupation led to an outbreak of cholera, which lasted from June 1854 to January 1855 and killed around 3,000 people, including the Archaeological Society's president, Georgios Gennadios. The situation meant that archaeological work was effectively impossible, and led to a financial crisis within the Archaeological Society which meant that it effectively ceased to exist, though Pittakis continued writing and publishing the Archaeological Journal, until 1858. Between 1851 and 1858, in the judgement of Vasileios Petrakos, Pittakis was effectively the sole figure in both the Archaeological Society and Greek archaeology. When Pittakis wrote to the Ministry of Education in October 1855, informing them of Gennadios' death and requesting approval to call a meeting to reconstitute the society, he received no response. In 1858, the Minister for Education, Charalampos Christopoulos, asked Pittakis to reform the society and hold elections for new officials. These took place in the second half of the year: Pittakis was elected as secretary, a position which he handed over the following year to Stefanos Koumanoudis.

During his time as Ephor General, Pittakis excavated on Anafi, recording monuments and collecting inscriptions. He also advocated for the demolition of the Frankish Tower, a medieval fortification built into the Propylaia, which would eventually be demolished in 1874. Between 1856 and 1860, he carried out further clearing on the Acropolis in preparation for the construction of a museum, which would eventually be begun in 1865. At this point, he considered the excavation of the Acropolis 'complete', since the excavations had reached bedrock in the 'main' area between the Parthenon, the Erechtheion and the Propylaia, and most of the post-Classical structures on the site had been removed. He also excavated in Athens' lower town, including the Odeon of Herodes Atticus in 1848–1858, in which he found calcined remains of pieces of cedar wood, which have been taken as evidence for the Odeon's original wooden roof. He also uncovered a large bomb, which was interpreted as a remnant of the artillery fired under Francesco Morosini during the Venetian siege of the Acropolis in 1687.

In 1860, he published his final edition of the Archaeological Journal, in which he claimed to have published a total of 4,158 inscriptions, "freely and for no compensation … merely moved by my yearning desire for the ancestral relics … [for] the common benefit and the dissemination to the ends of the world of every Greek letter, for the sake of Greek glory".

The later part of Pittakis' career as Ephor General saw the discovery, in 1861, of the Kerameikos cemetery. He died in Athens in 1863. Rangavis, with whom he had quarrelled over his approach to restorations and over his handling of the 'Naval Records' affair, delivered the eulogy at his funeral, in which he praised Pittakis' devotion to the Classical past and did much to establish his reputation as a patriot and protector of Greece's antiquities.

Legacy

The reception of Pittakis' work and impact on Greek archaeology has been polarised. He has been praised as the first Greek scholar to make substantial use of epigraphy in reconstructing the Classical past, for his efforts in preserving objects and the texts of inscriptions which would otherwise have been lost, and for his energetic approach to the excavation and conservation of Greece's ancient monuments. His published work remains an important source for the study of Athenian history and epigraphy.

At the same time, Pittakis' epigraphical work has been criticised for its lack of scholarly rigour, for Pittakis' errors in his knowledge of historical and literary sources, and for the inaccuracy with which he reconstructed or interpreted certain texts. His reconstructions of Athenian monuments have also been criticised for their haphazard methods, and for the licence with which Pittakis removed post-Classical structures and reorganised ancient remains. Doubts have also been raised as to Pittakis' scholarly integrity, particularly concerning matters pertaining to Greek nationalism.

In November 2013, a colloquium in Pittakis' memory was held at the Epigraphical Museum in Athens, entitled 'Light upon the Stones'.

Nationalism

As a young man, Pittakis was a member of the nationalist Filiki Eteria, and expressed Greek nationalist views throughout his life. The Archaeological Society of Athens, which he helped to found and in which he played a leading role until 1859, has been described as 'an intransigent ideological exponent of pure Classicism throughout the 19th century', and as both 'elitist' and 'archaistic'.

Reflecting in 1836 on his experience of archaeology before the War of Independence, he wrote of his 'fear of the Turks', and the haste with which he was forced to carry out his informal archaeological work on the Acropolis during the occupation. In support of his excavations of the Athenian Agora in the area of Vrysaki, Pittakis claimed that all but 60 houses in Athens had been destroyed by the Turks, a figure questioned by modern studies. Pittakis' accounts of the Turks' indifferent or destructive attitude to antiquities have been interpreted as part of a commonplace in pre-revolutionary Greece, where the Ottomans were presented as religious zealots liable to destroy Greek monuments: an argument which has been called 'overstated' in modern times, but which was used in the 19th century as a 'colonial tool' to justify the removal of antiquities to European collections and, after independence, to justify the demolition of Ottoman remains by presenting them as of little value compared with the 'authentic' Classical remains beneath them.

From 1836 onwards, he continually obstructed and frustrated British efforts to obtain plaster casts of the Parthenon sculptures still stored on the Acropolis, which Charles Newton, the Keeper of the British Museum, complained had left the sculptures there 'as leaves torn out of a manuscript are to the book itself.'

In 1852, Pittakis published a series of articles entitled 'Materials to be used to prove that the current inhabitants of Greece are descendants of the Ancient Greeks'. In these papers, he attempted to find analogues in Classical literary sources for popular phrases and practices of his own time. His analysis in these articles has been criticised for assuming that the conclusion was self-evident, and offering little analysis or criticism of the sources beyond a face-value reading. When Jakob Fallmerayer argued in 1830 that the Greek population had been totally replaced during the Early Medieval period by Slavic migration, Pittakis showed him false manuscripts intended to discredit his hypothesis.

Criticism

Pittakis's lack of philological education and theoretical archaeological knowledge limited the effectiveness of his scholarship and restorations. His work has been described as 'empirical' rather than systematic, and often characterised by a failure to keep records of what he had removed, particularly of remains later than the Classical period. In particular, Ludwig Ross criticised his clearing work in the Propylaea for failing to make any record of the later buildings he demolished. He was further criticised in the contemporary press for his practice of building 'walls' by setting various antiquities into plaster, which often broke up ensembles or presented artefacts of different periods and provenances together, and by British contemporaries for his practice of storing antiquities away from public view, denying most scholars access to them. His unsystematic record-keeping meant that he often published the same object or inscription multiple times, sometimes giving contradictory accounts of the date and place of its discovery, or recorded finds without giving their proper context. 

Pittakis' collaborator, Alexandros Rizos Rangavis, later described his approach to restoration as "unmethodical and by chance", and it was generally poorly received by both Greek and foreign observers. He has been criticised for undertaking restoration work with little prior study or documentation of the buildings, and for reconstructing both the Parthenon and the Erechtheion to place better-preserved items of masonry in more prominent positions, regardless of the original construction. His use of modern bricks where anastylosis could not be carried out as has been described as "amateurish". During his reconstruction of the Parthenon, he filled missing portions of the Doric columns with cylindrical brickwork, ignoring the fluting characteristic of the style. Fani Mallouchou-Tufano has described his restorative work as characterised by "enthusiasm … innocence, naivity and ignorance", pointing to his use of improvised material, including tree trunks, to restore the orthostates of the Erechtheion, as well as to a story reported by Rangavis of Pittakis' improvised repair to a column of the Propylaia, using a large hand saw, which almost caused the collapse of the structure and left the saw itself stuck inside the column until its removal in 2003. The negative reaction to his restorations, particularly in the Parthenon and Erechtheion, has been credited with inspiring the significant changes in approach adopted when the next major phase of the Acropolis' reconstruction began at the end of the 19th century, under Nikolaos Balanos. Many of Pittakis' restorations were reverted during subsequent phases of conservation on the site.

The later archaeologist of Mycenae, Spirydon Iakovidis, described Pittakis' work at the site as "half-hearted" in comparison to the excavations of Heinrich Schliemann and Christos Tsountas later in the century. His epigraphic publications have been criticised for their lack of scholarly rigour, particularly by comparison the contemporary work of Rangavis, who provided detailed information about the find-spot of each inscription, as well as a full transliteration and French translation. 

Nikolaos Papazarkadas has argued that many criticisms of Pittakis' integrity date to his feud with Ross, particularly the circumstances of the latter's resignation in 1836, and are probably "unfounded … [though] even in recent times some scholars ... uncritically replicat[e] largely-unfair accusations that go back to the nineteenth century." It was during this conflict that August Böckh, Ross and Pittakis' mutual collaborator as the editor of the Corpus Inscriptionum Graecorum, accused Pittakis of breaking inscriptions before sending them to him, so as to increase the payment Pittakis would receive for finding them.

Footnotes

Explanatory notes

References

Bibliography

 
 
 
 
 
 
 
 
 
 
 
 
 
 
 
 
 
 
 
 
 .
 
 
 
 
 
 
 
 
 
 
 
 
 
 
 
 
 
 
 
 
 
 
 
 
 
 
 
 
 
 
 
 
 
 
 

1798 births
1863 deaths
19th-century archaeologists
Archaeologists from Athens
Greek people of the Greek War of Independence
Mycenae
Ephors General of Greece